The year 1535 in science and technology included a number of events, some of which are listed here.

Anatomy
 Jacopo Berengario da Carpi publishes Anatomia Carpi, the first anatomical text with illustrations, in Bologna.

Botany
 Alter Botanischer Garten Tübingen established by Leonhart Fuchs.

Exploration
 March 10 – Fray Tomás de Berlanga discovers the Galapagos Islands when blown off course en route to Peru.

Births
 June 21 – Leonhard Rauwolf, German physician and botanist (died 1596)
 Georg Bartisch, German physician and ophthalmologist (died 1607)
 William Butler, English physician (died 1617)
 Cornelius Gemma, Flemish physician and astronomer (died 1578)
 approx. date – Giambattista della Porta, Italian physician (died 1615)

Deaths
 February 18 – Heinrich Cornelius Agrippa, German alchemist (born 1486)
 March 26 − Georg Tannstetter, Austrian physician and geographer (born 1482)

References

 
16th century in science
1530s in science